
Gmina Płoskinia is a rural gmina (administrative district) in Braniewo County, Warmian-Masurian Voivodeship, in northern Poland.

Villages
Gmina Płoskinia contains the villages and settlements of Bliżewo, Chruściel, Czosnowo, Dąbrowa, Demity, Długobór, Długobór-Osada, Giedyle, Jarzębiec, Łojewo, Łozy, Lubnowo, Pielgrzymowo, Pierławki, Pierzchały, Piórkowo, Płoskinia, Płoskinia-Kolonia, Podlechy, Robuzy, Strubno, Stygajny, Szalmia, Tolkowiec, Trąbki and Wysoka Braniewska.

Neighbouring gminas
Gmina Płoskinia is bordered by the gminas of Braniewo, Frombork, Młynary, Orneta, Pieniężno and Wilczęta.

References
Polish official population figures 2006

Ploskinia
Braniewo County